Keisean Nixon (born June 22, 1997) is an American football  cornerback for the Green Bay Packers of the National Football League (NFL). He played college football at Arizona Western before transferring to South Carolina, and was signed by the Oakland Raiders as an undrafted free agent in 2019.

Early life and high school
Nixon grew up in Compton, California and attended Salesian High School in Los Angeles, where he ran track and played running back and cornerback on the football team. He missed a large portion of his senior season due to a broken collarbone.

College career

Nixon began his collegiate career at Arizona Western College. As a freshman, he made 36 tackles with five interceptions and four pass breakups and was named a second-team All-NJCAA All-American as a sophomore after intercepting six passes (two returned for touchdowns) with five pass breakups and two kicks returned for touchdowns. Nixon transferred to the University of South Carolina for the final two years of his NCAA eligibility.

Nixon played mostly on special teams and as a reserve defensive back in his first season at South Carolina, playing in all 12 of the Gamecocks games with a fumble recovery and an interception. As a senior, Nixon started 11 games and led the team with nine passes broken up and finished third with 63 tackles.

Professional career

Oakland / Las Vegas Raiders
Nixon signed with the Oakland Raiders as an undrafted free agent on April 27, 2019. He made his NFL debut on September 9, 2019, against the Denver Broncos. Nixon finished his rookie season with 12 tackles, one pass defended and three kickoffs returned for 63 yards in 14 games played.

On September 2, 2021, Nixon was placed on injured reserve. He was activated on October 9.

Green Bay Packers
Nixon signed with the Green Bay Packers on March 26, 2022.

On September 25, 2022, in his second game on the active roster for the Packers, Nixon recorded seven combined tackles and one forced fumble in a Week 3 victory over the Tampa Bay Buccaneers.

Though Nixon saw defensive snaps throughout the 2022 season, the Packers began to utilize him more often as a return specialist in October. Beginning on October 16 during a Week 6 loss to the New York Jets, Nixon returned 35 kickoffs for 1,009 yards (with five returns of 50 yards or more), the only player in the NFL to record more than 1,000 yards that year. On January 1, 2023, Nixon returned a kickoff 105 yards for his first NFL touchdown against the Minnesota Vikings, swinging the game's momentum in the Packers' favor and propelling them to a 41-17 victory that kept their playoff hopes alive. He was named NFC Special Teams Player of the Week for his performance. Nixon finished the season as the NFL's leading kick returner, and was named a first-team member of the 2022 All-Pro Team at that position, receiving 44 out of 50 first-place votes.

On March 15, 2023, Nixon re-signed with the Packers for 1 year 4 million.

NFL career statistics

Regular season

Postseason

Personal life
Throughout the first four years of Nixon's NFL career, rumors persisted that he was the nephew of rapper Snoop Dogg. However, Nixon told the Milwaukee Journal Sentinel in 2022 that, while he did play in Snoop's nonprofit Snoop Youth Football League (SYFL) in high school, they are not actually related.

References

External links
Green Bay Packers bio
South Carolina Gamecocks bio

Living people
1997 births
American football defensive backs
Arizona Western Matadors football players
Green Bay Packers players
Las Vegas Raiders players
Oakland Raiders players
Players of American football from Los Angeles
South Carolina Gamecocks football players
Salesian High School (Los Angeles) alumni